Zombiegeddon is a 2003 American horror comedy film directed by Chris Watson. It stars Ari Bavel, Paul Darrigo, Felissa Rose, Edwin Neal, Linnea Quigley, Tom Savini, and Uwe Boll. It was distributed by Troma Entertainment, It was released to DVD on July 11, 2006.

Synopsis 
Satan has created a human-like race called zombies. When the zombies begin taking over the world, dirty cops Jeff and Cage find themselves in the unenviable position of stopping them before it's too late. Jeff soon learns that he alone has the power to defeat them if he's up to the task. As the body count piles up and internal affairs officers investigate Jeff and Cage for their prior wrongdoings, time is running out.

Cast 
 Felissa Rose as Melissa
 Edwin Neal as God
 Tom Savini as Jesus Christ
 Joe Estevez as Brooks
 Jeff Dylan Graham as Harper
 Linnea Quigley as Principal Russo
 Uwe Boll as Himself
 William Smith as Lord Zombie
 Brinke Stevens as Laura Reynolds
 Lloyd Kaufman as Bill
 Robert Z'Dar as Det. Bobby Romero
 Conrad Brooks as Dean Martinson
 Trent Haaga as Ted Kopafeel
 Jeff Burr as Phil (voice)
 Joe Fleishaker as Caller #1 (voice)
 Ron Jeremy as Todd (voice)
 Julie Strain as Dispatcher (voice)
 Fred Olen Ray as Fred (voice)

References

External links
 
 
 

2003 films
2003 horror films
2003 comedy horror films
American comedy horror films
American zombie comedy films
2000s English-language films
Troma Entertainment films
Parodies of horror
2003 comedy films
2000s American films